Rough Music: Blair, Bombs, Baghdad, London, Terror is a 2005 book by British-Pakistani writer, journalist, political activist and historian Tariq Ali.

Synopsis
The book is a reaction to the 7 July 2005 London bombings, which Ali describes as "murderous mayhem that Blair's war has sown in Iraq". The book criticises perceived attacks on civil liberties. He invokes "great dissenters" of the past and calls for "political resistance, within Parliament and without".

Reception
The book was reviewed in the peer-reviewed academic journal Current Issues in Criminal Justice and Arena magazine.

References

2005 non-fiction books
Books about politics of the United Kingdom
Books about imperialism
Iraq War books
Books about terrorism
Books about foreign relations of the United Kingdom
Books about foreign relations of the United States
Books by Tariq Ali
English-language books
War on Terror books
Verso Books books